Bruce Neil Carnegie-Brown (born December 1959) has been Chairman of the insurance market Lloyd’s of London since June 2017, and is Vice Chairman of Banco Santander. He is also chairman of the Marylebone Cricket Club and of Cuvva Ltd. He was Chairman of the price comparison website Moneysupermarket.com Group from April 2014 to May 2019.

Early life and education 
Carnegie-Brown was born on 27 December 1959 in Freetown, Sierra Leone. His father was an engineer and tobacco executive, and the family migrated often, including time in Libya, Jordan, Tanzania and Malaysia. Bruce attended Cheltenham College, in 1973 and leaving in 1977. In 1977, he won a scholarship to study English Language and Literature at Exeter College, Oxford  matriculating in 1978 and graduating with a First Class Honours degree in 1981.

Business career 
After leaving university, Carnegie-Brown spent four years at Bank of America as an investment banker, before joining JP Morgan, where he worked for 18 years, including three years in Tokyo as chairman and head of their Asia-Pacific investment banking business from 1997 to 2000. He was a member of the Global Investment Banking Management Committee from 1997 to 2000 and a member of the Global Markets Management Committee from 2001 to 2003. From 2003 to 2006 he worked for insurance broker Marsh & McLennan as CEO of its UK, European and Middle East businesses.  From 2006 to 2009, Carnegie-Brown was a founder and Managing Partner of 3i Quoted Private Equity plc, a private equity fund.

Carnegie-Brown was a Non-Executive Director of Close Brothers Group plc from 2006 to 2014; a Non-Executive Director of Catlin Group Ltd from 2010 to 2014; Chairman of Aon UK Ltd from 2012 to 2015; and a Non-Executive Director of JLT Group plc from 2016 to 2017. He was Chairman of Moneysupermarket Group plc from May 2014 to May 2019, having joined the board in 2010. He was a non-Executive Director of Santander UK from 2012 to 2021.

He has been Chairman of Lloyd's since June 2017, and a vice-chairman of Banco Santander since February 2015. From 2017 to 2020, he was President of the Chartered Management Institute. He was a trustee of Historic Royal Palaces from January 2015 until October 2019 and was a trustee of the Shakespeare's Globe Trust from 2006 to 2014. He was appointed a Deputy Lieutenant of Greater London in 2015. Bruce is a past President of the Chartered Institute of Bankers (which became the Institute of Financial Services and is now the London Institute of Finance and Banking).

In 2019, Carnegie-Brown was appointed chairman of InsurTech start-up Cuvva Ltd.

In October 2021 he became Chairman of the Marylebone Cricket Club. In July 2022, the Club announced that a disciplinary panel had imposed a six-month suspension of his membership of the Club, suspended for a period of two years. This followed remarks he made at the Club's AGM about members "taking ages to empty their colostomy bags", unaware that his microphone was switched on.

In April 2022, he was appointed Chair of the Leadership Council of TheCityUK, the trade association for the U.K. financial and professional services industries.

Personal life 
Bruce lives in Putney, London, and is married to Jane and has four children. His brother, Ian Carnegie-Brown, is an investment banker at UBS.

References

External links 
Bloomberg profile

Living people
British business executives
1959 births
Alumni of Exeter College, Oxford
Members of the Board of Directors of the Banco Santander
Deputy Lieutenants of Greater London